The 52nd government of Turkey (30 October 1995 – 6 March 1996) was a caretaker coalition government formed by True Path Party (DYP) and Republican People's Party (CHP).

Background
The 50th government of Turkey came to an end because Deniz Baykal of CHP asked for an earlier date for the scheduled elections. Prime minister Tansu Çiller tried a minority government, but the 51st government of Turkey could not receive the vote of confidence. Tansu Çiller accepted Deniz Baykal's proposal, and the 52nd government was formed as a caretaker government until the elections. In the government, most of the DYP ministers kept the same seats they held in the 51st government.

The government
In the list below, the serving period of cabinet members who served only a part of the cabinet's lifespan are shown in the column "Notes". According to the Turkish constitution, independent names are to be appointed to interior, justice, and transportation ministries before the elections.

Aftermath
The elections held on 24 December 1995 marked the end of the government. However, before the next government was formed, the 52nd government continued as caretaker.

References

Democrat Party (Turkey, current) politicians
Republican People's Party (Turkey) politicians
Cabinets of Turkey
1995 establishments in Turkey
1996 disestablishments in Turkey
Cabinets established in 1995
Cabinets disestablished in 1996
Coalition governments of Turkey
Members of the 52nd government of Turkey
Democrat Party (Turkey, current)